Sary-Chelek (also Sarychelek, Kyrgyz: Сарычелек) is a mountain lake located in Sary-Chelek Nature Reserve in Jalal-Abad Province in Western Kyrgyzstan. It is north of Arkyt (the park headquarters) at the eastern end of the Chatkal Range. There are a number of smaller lakes in the area. It is drained by the river Toskool, a tributary of the Kojata.

References

External links
Sary-Chelek Nature Reserve - Photogallery by Azamat Imanaliev

Sary-Chelek
Sary-Chelek
Biosphere reserves of Kyrgyzstan